St Saviourgate  is a historic street in the city of York. St Saviour's Church was built here in the 11th-century, and the street was first mentioned in 1175, as "Ketmongergate", street of the flesh sellers.

History

The area in which the street runs just outside the city walls of Roman Eboracum, north of a marshy area around the River Foss.  When the foundations of new houses were dug here in the seventeenth century, large numbers of animal horns were found, indicating the site of a Roman temple, next to the palace.

The street was first mentioned in 1175, when it was known as "Ketmongergate", street of the flesh sellers.  St Saviour's Church was built on the street in the 11th-century, and by 1368, it had given its name to the street.

The street became a centre for nonconformism in the city.  The York Unitarian Chapel was built in 1693, the Congregationalist Salem Chapel was built in 1839, and the Central Methodist Chuch in 1840.  Much of the rest of the street was rebuilt in the 18th-century, and in 1736, it was described by Francis Drake as "one of the neatest and best-built streets in the city".  The street was widened in 1777.  In the 1960, the Salem Chapel was demolished to make way for an office block.

Architecture and layout
The street runs from the junction of Colliergate and Whip-Ma-Whop-Ma-Gate, north-east to the junction of Spen Lane and St Saviour's Place.  Historically, St Saviour's Place was regarded as part of the street.  Hungate led off the south side of the street, but following the construction of Stonebow, the Stonebow House office block was built and blocked the route.

Notable buildings on the north-west side of the street include the Methodist and Unitarian churches; a masonic hall which was originally built as the city's Mechanics' Institute; 18th-century houses at 27, 29 and 31, 33 and 35; and an early Victorian range at 1-7 which was formerly a department store.  On the south-east side of the street lie the rear of Stonebow House, described by Nikolaus Pevsner as "disastrous"; St Saviour's Church, now housing the Jorvik DIG centre; Lady Hewley's Almshouses; the terrace of 16-22 St Saviourgate, built in 1740; other 18th-century houses at 24, 26, 30 and 32; and 34 St Saviourgate, with 15th-century origins.

References

 
Streets in York
Odonyms referring to religion